The Italian word Cancello (meaning gate), plural Cancelli, may refer to:

Places of Italy
Cancelli, hamlet of Foligno, in the Province of Perugia
Cancello, hamlet of San Felice a Cancello, in the Province of Caserta 
Cancello e Arnone, municipality of the Province of Caserta
San Felice a Cancello, municipality of the Province of Caserta

Architecture
Cancelli (or cancellarii), lattice-works placed before a window